Aclis maestratii is a species of sea snail, a marine gastropod mollusk in the family Eulimidae.

Original Description
 Poppe G.T. & Tagaro S. (2016). New marine mollusks from the central Philippines in the families Aclididae, Chilodontidae, Cuspidariidae, Nuculanidae, Nystiellidae, Seraphsidae and Vanikoridae. Visaya. 4(5): 83-103. page(s): 88

References

External links
 Worms Link

maestratii
Gastropods described in 2016